Marcel Marceau (born Marcel Mangel; 22 March 1923 – 22 September 2007) was a French actor and mime artist most famous for his stage persona, "Bip the Clown." He referred to mime as the "art of silence," performing professionally worldwide for over 60 years. As a Jewish youth, he lived in hiding and worked with the French Resistance during most of World War II, giving his first major performance to 3,000 troops after the liberation of Paris in August. Following the war, he studied dramatic art and mime in Paris.

Early life

Marcel Marceau was born  in Strasbourg, France, to a Jewish family. His father, Charles Mangel, was a kosher butcher originally from Będzin, Poland. His mother, Anne Werzberg, came from Yabluniv, present-day Ukraine. Through his mother's family, he was a cousin of Israeli singer Yardena Arazi. When Marcel was four years old, the family moved to Lille, but they later returned to Strasbourg.

After France's invasion by Nazi Germany, Marcel, then 17, fled with his family to Limoges. His cousin Georges Loinger, one of the members of the French Jewish Resistance in France (Organisation Juive de Combat-OJC, aka Armée Juive), urged him to join the French Jewish Resistance in France to help rescue Jews during the Holocaust. The OJC, which was composed of nine clandestine Jewish networks, rescued thousands of Jewish children and adults during in France.   

He was schooled in the Paris suburbs at the home of Yvonne Hagnauer, while pretending to be a worker at the school she directed; Hagnauer would later receive the honor of Righteous Among the Nations from Yad Vashem. In 1944 Marcel's father was captured by the Gestapo and deported to the Auschwitz concentration camp, where he was killed. Marcel's mother survived.

Marcel and his older brother, Alain, adopted the last name "Marceau" during the German occupation of France; the name was chosen as a reference to François Séverin Marceau-Desgraviers, a general of the French Revolution. The two brothers joined the French  Resistance in Limoges.   They rescued numerous children from the race laws and concentration camps in the framework of the Jewish Resistance in France, and, after the liberation of Paris, joined the French army. Owing to Marceau's fluency in English, French, and German, he worked as a liaison officer with General George Patton's Third Army.

According to Marceau, when he was five years of age, his mother took him to see a Charlie Chaplin film, which entranced him and led him to want to become a mime artist. The first time he used mime was after France was invaded, in order to keep Jewish children quiet while he helped them escape to neutral Switzerland.

After the war ended in 1945, he enrolled as a student in Charles Dullin's School of Dramatic Art in the Sarah Bernhardt Theatre in Paris, where he studied with teachers such as Joshua Smith and Étienne Decroux and Jean-Louis Barrault.

Career 

Marceau joined Jean-Louis Barrault's company and was soon cast in the role of Arlequin in a pantomime, Baptiste (which Barrault had interpreted in the film Les Enfants du Paradis). Marceau's performance won him such acclaim that he was encouraged to present his first "mimodrama", Praxitele and the Golden Fish, at the Bernhardt Theatre that same year. The acclaim was unanimous and Marceau's career as a mime artist was firmly established.

In 1947 Marceau created Bip the Clown, whom he first played at the Théâtre de Poche (Pocket Theatre) in Paris. In his appearance he wore a striped pullover and a battered, be-flowered silk opera hat. The outfit signified life's fragility and Bip became his alter ego, just as the "Little Tramp" had become Charlie Chaplin's. Bip's misadventures with everything from butterflies to lions, from ships and trains to dancehalls and restaurants, were limitless. As a stylist of pantomime, Marceau was acknowledged without peer. Marceau, during a televised talk with Todd Farley, expresses his respect for the mime techniques that Charlie Chaplin used in his films, noting that Chaplin seemed to be the only silent film actor who used mime.

His silent mimed exercises, which included The Cage, Walking Against the Wind, The Mask Maker, and In The Park, all became classic displays. Satires on everything from sculptors to matadors were described as works of genius. Of his summation of the ages of man in the famous Youth, Maturity, Old Age and Death, one critic said: "He accomplishes in less than two minutes what most novelists cannot do in volumes." During an interview with CBS in 1987, Marceau tried to explain some of his inner feelings while creating mime, calling it the "art of silence:"

In 1949, following his receipt of the Deburau Prize (established as a memorial to the 19th-century mime master Jean-Gaspard Deburau) for his second mimodrama, Death before Dawn, Marceau founded Compagnie de Mime Marcel Marceau, the only company of pantomime in the world at the time. The ensemble played the leading Paris theatres, such as Le Théâtre des Champs-Élysées, Le Théâtre de la Renaissance, and the Bernhardt Theatre, as well as other playhouses throughout the world.

From 1959 to 1960, a retrospective of his mimodramas, including The Overcoat by Gogol, ran for a full year at the Amibigu Théâtre in Paris. He produced 15 other mimodramas, including Pierrot de Montmartre, The Three Wigs, The Pawn Shop, 14 July, The Wolf of Tsu Ku Mi, Paris Cries — Paris Laughs and Don Juan (adapted from the Spanish writer Tirso de Molina).

World recognition 

Marceau performed all over the world to spread the "art of silence" (L'art du silence). It was the intellectual minority who knew of him until he first toured the United States in 1955 and 1956, close on the heels of his North American debut at the Stratford Festival of Canada. After his opening engagement at the Phoenix Theater in New York, which received rave reviews, he moved to the larger Barrymore Theater to accommodate the public demand. This first U.S. tour ended with a record-breaking return to standing-room-only crowds in San Francisco, Chicago, Washington, D.C., Philadelphia, Los Angeles, and other major cities. His extensive transcontinental tours included South America, Africa, Australia, China, Japan, South East Asia, Taiwan, Russia, and Europe. His last world tour covered the United States in 2004 and he returned to Europe in 2005 and Australia in 2006. He was one of the world's most renowned mime artists. 
Marceau's art became familiar to millions through his many television appearances. His first television performance as a star performer on the Max Liebman, Mike Douglas and Dinah Shore, and he also had his one-man show entitled "Meet Marcel Marceau". He teamed with Red Skelton in three concerts of pantomimes.

Marceau also showed his versatility in motion pictures such as Professor Ping in Barbarella (1968); First Class (1970), in which he played 17 roles; Shanks (1974), where he combined his silent art, playing a deaf and mute puppeteer, and his speaking talent, as a mad scientist; and a cameo as himself in Mel Brooks
Silent Movie (1976), in which, with intentional irony, his character has the only audible speaking part, uttering the single word "Non!" when Brooks asks him (via intertitle) if he would participate in the film. His last film appearances included small roles in Klaus Kinski's Paganini (1989) and Joseph's Gift (1998). He also had a role in a low-budget film roughly based on his life story called Paint It White. The film was never completed because another actor in the movie, a lifelong friend with whom he had attended school, died halfway through filming.

As an author, Marceau published two books for children, the Marcel Marceau Alphabet Book and the Marcel Marceau Counting Book, and poetry and illustrations, including La ballade de Paris et du Monde (The Ballad of Paris and the World), an art book which he wrote in 1966, and The Story of Bip, written and illustrated by Marceau and published by Harper and Row. In 1974, he posed for artist Kenneth Hari and worked on paintings and drawings that resulted in a book and artwork in many museum collections. In 1982, Le Troisième Œil, (The Third Eye), his collection of ten original lithographs, was published in Paris with an accompanying text by Marceau. Belfond of Paris published Pimporello in 1987. In 2001, a new photo book for children titled Bip in a Book, published by Stewart, Tabori & Chang, appeared in bookstores in the U.S., France, and Australia.

In 1969, Marcel Marceau opened his first school, École Internationale de Mime, in the Théàtre de la Musique in Paris. The school was open for two years with fencing, acrobatics, ballet, and five teachers of mime.

In 1978, Marceau established his school, École Internationale de Mimodrame de Paris, Marcel Marceau (International School of Mimodrame of Paris, Marcel Marceau).
In 1996, he established the Marceau Foundation to promote mime in the United States.

In 1995, pop megastar Michael Jackson, who had been friends with Marceau for nearly 20 years, planned a concert together with him for HBO, but the concert was canceled after Jackson was hospitalized for exhaustion during rehearsals. Jackson, during an interview, said that he had always been "in awe" at Marceau's skill as a performer:

In 2000, Marceau brought his full mime company to New York City to present his new melodrama, The Bowler Hat, previously seen in Paris, London, Tokyo, Taipei, Caracas, Santo Domingo, Valencia (Venezuela), and Munich. From 1999, when Marceau returned with his classic solo show to New York and San Francisco after 15-year absences for critically acclaimed sold-out runs, his career in America enjoyed a remarkable renaissance with strong appeal to a third generation. He later appeared to overwhelming acclaim for extended engagements at such legendary American theaters as The Ford's Theatre in Washington, D.C., the American Repertory Theater in Cambridge, Massachusetts, and the Geffen Playhouse in Los Angeles demonstrating the timeless appeal of the work and the mastery of this unique artist.

Marceau's new total company production Les Contes Fantastiques (Fantasy Tales) opened to great acclaim at the Théâtre Antoine in Paris.

Personal life 

Marceau was married three times: first to Huguette Mallet, with whom he had two sons, Michel and Baptiste; then, to Ella Jaroszewicz, with whom he had no children. His third wife was Anne Sicco, with whom he had two daughters, Camille and Aurélia.

Artist and fellow mime Paulette Frankl released a memoir in August 2014 about her decades-long relationship with Marceau, Marcel & Me: A Memoir of Love, Lust, and Illusion.

Death 

Marceau died in a retirement home in Cahors, France, on 22 September 2007 at the age of 84. At his burial ceremony, the second movement of Mozart's Piano Concerto No. 21 (which Marceau long used as an accompaniment for an elegant mime routine) was played, as was the sarabande of Bach's Cello Suite No. 5. Marceau was interred at the Père Lachaise Cemetery in Paris.

Filmography

Theater 
 1946 : Baptiste by Jacques Prévert & Joseph Kosma, mise en scène Jean-Louis Barrault, Théâtre Marigny
 1947 : Baptiste by Jacques Prévert & Joseph Kosma, mise en scène Jean-Louis Barrault, Théâtre des Célestins
 1947 : La Fontaine de jouvenceence de Boris Kochno, mise en scène Jean-Louis Barrault, Théâtre Marigny
 1947 : Le Procès inspired by Franz Kafka, mise en scène Jean-Louis Barrault, Théâtre Marigny
 1947 : Spectacle Marcel Marceau, Théâtre de Poche Montparnasse
 1948 : L'État de siège (The State of Siege) by Albert Camus, mise en scène Jean-Louis Barrault, Théâtre Marigny 
 1949 : Nouvelles Pantomimes burlesques and Un mimodrame by Marcel Marceau, mise en scène Marcel Marceau, Théâtre de Poche Montparnasse
 1950 : Les Pantomimes de Bip and Mort avant l'aube, Studio des Champs-Élysées
 1951 : Le Manteau – Moriana et Galvan by Nikolai Gogol and Alexandre Arnoux, mise en scène Marcel Marceau, Studio des Champs-Élysées
 1952 : Le Pierrot de Montmartre by Marcel Marceau, Théâtre Sarah Bernhardt
 1953 : Les Trois Perruques – Un soir aux Funambules by Marcel Marceau, Comédie des Champs-Élysées
 1956 : Loup de Tsu Ku Mi – Mont de Piété – 14 Juillet de Marcel Marceau, Théâtre de l'Ambigu
 1958 : Le Petit Cirque and Les Matadors by Marcel Marceau, Théâtre de l'Ambigu 
 1964 : Don Juan by Marcel Marceau, Théâtre de l'Ambigu
 1972 : Le Vagabond des étoiles by Marcel Marceau, Théâtre des Champs-Élysées
 1974 : Pantomimes by Marcel Marceau, USA Tour
 1978 : Mimodrame by Marcel Marceau, Théâtre de la Porte-Saint-Martin 
 1997 : Le Chapeau Melon by Marcel Marceau, Espace Cardin
 1997 : Déserts ou les 7 rêves de Sarah, mise en scène Anne Sicco, Scène Nationale d'Albi 
 2003 : Contes fantastiques by Marcel Marceau, Théâtre Antoine

Awards and honors 

Marceau was made a commander of the Ordre des Arts et des Lettres, an Officer of the Légion d'honneur, and in 1978 he received the Médaille Vermeil de la Ville de Paris. The City of Paris awarded him a grant which enabled him to reopen his International School which offered a three-year curriculum. In November 1998, President Jacques Chirac made Marceau a grand officer of the Ordre national du Mérite.

Marceau was an elected member of the Academy of Fine Arts Berlin, the Academy of Fine Arts Munich, the Académie des Beaux-Arts of the Institut de France.

Marceau held honorary doctorates from Ohio State University, Linfield College, Princeton University and the University of Michigan. In April 2001, Marceau was awarded the Wallenberg Medal by the University of Michigan in recognition of his humanitarianism and acts of courage aiding Jewish people and other refugees during World War II.

In 1999 New York City declared 18 March "Marcel Marceau Day".

Marceau accepted the honor and responsibilities of serving as Goodwill Ambassador for the United Nations Second World Assembly on Aging, which took place in Madrid, Spain, in April 2002.

Published works 

 Preface to the French high wire artist Philippe Petit's 1985 book, On The High Wire. 
 Foreword to Stefan Niedziałkowski's and Jonathan Winslow's 1993 book, Beyond the Word—the World of Mime. 
 Book, "Pimporello," adapted and edited by Robert Hammond, 1991, Peter Owen Publishers.

Bibliography 

 Martin, Ben. Marcel Marceau: Master of Mime, Paddington Press (UK) Limited, 1978. 
 Royce, Anya Peterson. Movement and Meaning: Creativity and Interpretation in Ballet and Mime, Indiana University Press, 1984.

See also 

 Resistance (2020 film)

References

External links 

 The World of Mime Theatre Library: Marcel Marceau
 
 
 An Audio Remembrance by Rob Mermin former student of Marceau
 
 Brilliant Careers: Marcel Marceau at Salon.com

1923 births
2007 deaths
Actors from Strasbourg
Alsatian Jews
20th-century French Jews
Burials at Père Lachaise Cemetery
Commandeurs of the Ordre des Arts et des Lettres
Members of the Académie des beaux-arts
French clowns
French male film actors
French mimes
French military personnel of World War II
Grand Officers of the Ordre national du Mérite
Jewish French male actors
Jewish mimes 
Jews in the French resistance
Officiers of the Légion d'honneur